Crisilla picta is a species of minute sea snail with an operculum; this organism is a marine gastropod mollusk or micromollusk in the family Rissoidae.

Distribution 
 Madeira

Original description 
Crisilla picta was originally collected by Reverend Robert Boog Watson in Madeira and it was sent to British malacologist John Gwyn Jeffreys, who described it as a new species under name Rissoa picta in 1867. Jeffreys's original text (the type description) reads as follows:

References
This article incorporates public domain text from reference 

Rissoidae
Molluscs of Madeira
Gastropods described in 1867
Taxa named by John Gwyn Jeffreys